Symphony No. 9 in  C major, K. 73/75a, by Wolfgang Amadeus Mozart, has an uncertain provenance. The most likely date of its composition appears to be late 1769 or early 1770 during Mozart's first Italian journey, although some authorities have dated it "probably not before early summer 1772". It may have been started in Salzburg, before the first Italian journey began, and completed during the trip.

The symphony is in four movements and is Mozart's first extant symphony in the key of C major. There is no information concerning which of the many Italian concerts given by the Mozarts during this visit saw this symphony's first performance. The autograph score is  preserved in the Biblioteka Jagiellońska in Kraków.

Movements and instrumentation
The symphony is score for 2 flutes, 2 oboes, bassoon, 2 horns, 2 trumpets, timpani, strings and continuo.

There are four movements.

Allegro, 
Andante in F major, 
Menuetto and Trio, 
Molto allegro,

References

Sources
Zaslaw, Neal: Mozart's Symphonies: Context, Performance Practice, Reception OUP, Oxford 1991

External links

09
Compositions in C major
1772 compositions